Tenderly is a 1989 studio album by George Benson, produced by long time collaborator Tommy LiPuma.

Reception

In a review for AllMusic, Richard S. Ginell wrote that Benson has gotten the message by "giving up the fruitless search for decent contemporary material, he switched gears and recorded an album of old standards with top-grade jazz musicians".

Track listing

Personnel 

Musicians: 

 George Benson – guitar (1-5, 7, 8), vocals (1, 3-6, 8)
 McCoy Tyner – acoustic piano (1-6, 8)
 Ron Carter – double bass (1-6, 8)
 Louis Hayes – drums (1, 6)
 Herlin Riley – drums (2-5)
 Al Foster – drums (8)
 Lenny Castro – percussion (4, 5)
 Marty Paich – horn and string arrangements

Production 
 Producer – Tommy LiPuma
 Recorded by Elliot Scheiner
 Additional Recording – Bill Schnee, Al Schmitt and Steve Rinkoff
 Assistant Engineers – Peter Darmi, Troy Halderson, Roy Hendrickson, Joe Pirrera, Jim Shefler and Bart Stevens.
 Mixed by Bill Schnee
 Assistant Technician – Russ DeFilippis
 Mastered by Doug Sax at The Mastering Lab (Hollywood, California).
 Project Administrator – Lou Snead
 Art Direction and Design – Ph. D
 Photography – Harris Savides
 Management – Ken Fritz Management

Charts

References 

George Benson albums
1989 albums
Warner Records albums